The Texas Star Party (TSP) is a large annual star party in the United States.

TSP was started by Deborah Byrd, members of the Austin Astronomical Society, and McDonald Observatory in August 1979. It was a weekend gathering of amateur astronomers at Davis Mountains State Park near McDonald Observatory in far west Texas. In 1982, TSP was reorganized as a week-long event and was held at the Prude Guest Ranch near Fort Davis, Texas. For one year only, in 1997, the event was held at Alto Frio Baptist Encampment, on the banks of the Frio River, 40 miles north of Uvalde, Texas.  Also in 1997, "Texas Star Party, Inc." was registered as a Texas Non-Profit Corporation. In 1998, TSP returned to Prude Ranch, where it continues to be held annually in late April or in May near the time of new moon.  By 2007, the event attracted 580 attendees, even though the weather was very poor.  Attendees mostly come from across North America, and some from far overseas.

Activities include dark sky observing and imaging, an astrophotography contest, guest speakers, tours of McDonald Observatory, commercial vendors, and the opportunity to view numerous home built telescopes and gadgets. It has strongly supported efforts to reduce light pollution. Two annual awards have traditionally been presented at TSP: The Lone Star Gazer Award (for personal achievement, accomplishment, and expertise) and The Omega Centauri Award (for public awareness and/or promotion of astronomy). Complete lists of all past award winners as well as past guest speakers may be found on the TSP History page listed below. The TSP's observing fields at the Prude Ranch are the central field, the upper field, the upper-upper field, and the lower field. The TSP holds telescope programs of varying levels, binocular programs, a novice program, and an advanced observing program. The programs require the participant to observe a certain number of specified objects, and completion of a program will be awarded by a pin and in some cases another award. The binocular programs are usually a regular binocular program, an advanced binocular program, and a binocular program "from hell".

While at TSP 1996, Brian A. Skiff named one of the asteroids that he had previously discovered. That asteroid, 4932 Texstapa, was discovered on March 9, 1984 and was named for the Texas Star Party on the occasion of its 18th anniversary in May 1996.

The TSP is run by around 50-70 volunteers each year, drawn mostly from amateur astronomy clubs with support from the University of Texas’ McDonald Observatory.

The 42nd TSP was cancelled in 2020 caused by the COVID-19 pandemic. It was deferred to 2021.

See also
 List of astronomical societies

References

General references

 TSP History page of Official Texas Star Party Website

External links
 Official Texas Star Party Website
 TSP Clear Sky Clock Forecast of astronomical observing conditions for Texas Star Party.

Amateur astronomy organizations
Star parties
Texas culture
Science events in the United States
Annual events in Texas